David García de la Cruz (born 16 January 1981) is a Spanish retired footballer who played as a left back.

He spent most of his professional career with Espanyol, appearing in 243 competitive matches during 12 La Liga seasons and winning two Copa del Rey trophies.

Club career
Born in Manresa, Barcelona, Catalonia, García was a product of RCD Espanyol's youth system, and made his La Liga debut on 8 January 2000 in a 0–0 home draw against Deportivo de La Coruña, becoming a regular fixture in the 2001–02 season and also being named second team captain after Raúl Tamudo, the only player to have been on Espanyol's books for longer; on 23 March 2003 he scored the first of only two competitive goals during his career, helping to a 1–1 draw at Valencia CF.

In early 2007, García renewed his link to the Pericos for a further two seasons, stating about the deal: "I want to finish my career here. I can't imagine myself wearing any other shirt." During that campaign, however, he only appeared in 16 games overall (nine in the league, adding seven in the club's runner-up run in the UEFA Cup) mainly due to a knee injury.

In 2008–09, García played in just 14 league matches as he again dealt with physical ailments, but was instrumental in the final stretch, appearing in seven complete fixtures out of the last ten – of which Espanyol won eight. On 12 June 2009 he extended his contract for two additional years, featuring in 38 combined games during that timespan.

On 4 August 2011, García moved to Segunda División club Girona FC. He was first-choice for the vast majority of his tenure, retiring at the age of 34.

Honours
Espanyol
Copa del Rey: 1999–2000, 2005–06
UEFA Cup: Runner-up 2006–07

References

External links

1981 births
Living people
Footballers from Manresa
Spanish footballers
Association football defenders
La Liga players
Segunda División players
Segunda División B players
Tercera División players
RCD Espanyol B footballers
RCD Espanyol footballers
Girona FC players
Spain youth international footballers
Spain under-21 international footballers
Catalonia international footballers